Vexillum nodai is a species of small sea snail, marine gastropod mollusk in the family Costellariidae, the ribbed miters.

Description
The length of the shell attains 30 mm, its diameter 9.7 mm.

Distribution
This marine species occurs KwaZulu-Natal, South Africa; also off the Philippines and Japan.

References

 Turner, H.; Salisbury, R. A. (1999). Three new costellariid species from Japan, Papua New Guinea and other Indo-Pacific locations. Apex. 14 (3-4): 73-80

nodai
Gastropods described in 1999